Sweet Candy Power is a studio album by the Japanese pop-punk band Shonen Knife, released in June 2019. It features guest appearances by former band members Ritsuko Taneda and Naru Ishizuka.

Critical reception

Reviewers in the alternative rock community generally praised the album as a continuation of Shonen Knife's history. Spill Magazine noted that "The album stays true to their familiar sound of loud, driving chords layered with sugary melodic narratives of food and simple enjoyments." Rock at Night called the album "pure punk-pop pleasure but don’t be fooled by the light-hearted, infectious melodies, food-oriented themes, and sweet harmonies—there’s plenty of lead guitar riffs and pogo-dancing beats, that remind us Shonen Knife are serious musicians." Guitar Girl called the album "an exuberant good time, wrapped in a cute package [and] guaranteed to put a smile on your face." In a review of the album Punk News stated that "The ability of this band to blend their unmistakable pop sensibilities with their love for punk rock is first rate."

Track listing

Personnel 
Naoko Yamano - guitar, vocals
Atsuko Yamano - bass, backing vocals
Risa Kawano - drums, backing vocals

References

2019 albums
Shonen Knife albums